Vallecilla is a surname. Notable people with the surname include:

Benito Ruíz de Salazar Vallecilla (died 1651), Spanish colonial governor
Gustavo Vallecilla (born 1999), Ecuadorian footballer
Nancy Vallecilla (born 1957), Ecuadorian hurdler and heptathlete

Spanish-language surnames